Neidenfels is an Ortsgemeinde – a municipality belonging to a Verbandsgemeinde, a kind of collective municipality – in the Bad Dürkheim district in Rhineland-Palatinate, Germany.

Geography

Location 
The municipality, a papermaking village in the middle of the Palatinate Forest, lies between Neustadt an der Weinstraße und Kaiserslautern. It belongs to the Verbandsgemeinde of Lambrecht, whose seat is in the like-named town.

History 
Neidenfels came into being in the early 15th century in the protection of Niedenfels Castle, which sometime came to be called Neidenfels. The castle itself dated back to 1330 when it was built by Count Palatine Rudolf II.

Religion 
In 2007, 41.8% of the inhabitants were Evangelical and 41.3% Catholic. The rest belonged to other faiths or adhered to none.

Politics

Town council 
The council is made up of 12 council members, who were elected at the municipal election held on 7 June 2009, and the honorary mayor as chairman.

The municipal election held on 7 June 2009 yielded the following results:

Coat of arms 
The German blazon reads: In Rot ein steinernes silbernes Haus in Vorderansicht mit Treppengiebel.

The municipality's arms might in English heraldic language be described thus: Gules a stone house gable affronty argent with a crow-stepped gable.

The arms were approved in 1971 by the now abolished Regierungsbezirk administration in Neustadt. The one charge is canting for an old noble family's name, Steinhausen von Neidenstein (Stein is “stone” in German and Haus is “house”).

Culture and sightseeing

Buildings 
Above the village stands Neidenfels Castle, a ruin from the 14th century. In the village itself is a papermill.

Near Neidenfels lies the Drachenfels rocky plateau, which can be reached from Neidenfels over hiking trails.

Economy and infrastructure

Transport 
Stopping at Neidenfels railway station are RheinNeckar S-Bahn trains on the Saarbrücken–Mannheim line. Lines S1 and S2 afford direct links to Kaiserslautern in the west and Ludwigshafen, Mannheim and Heidelberg in the east. Public transport is integrated into the VRN, whose fares therefore apply.

Further reading 
 Alexander Thon (Hrsg.): Wie Schwalbennester an den Felsen geklebt. Burgen in der Nordpfalz. 1. Aufl. Schnell + Steiner, Regensburg 2005, S. 112–115, .

References

External links 

Municipality’s official webpage 

Palatinate Forest
Bad Dürkheim (district)